Randall John "Randy" Tate (born November 23, 1965) is an American politician and a former Republican member of the United States House of Representatives from Washington.

Tate grew up in suburban Seattle and graduated with an Associate of Arts degree from Tacoma Community College. In 1988, he received a Bachelor of Arts degree from Western Washington University at Bellingham. From 1989 until 1995, he was a member of the Washington House of Representatives.

Tate was elected to Congress in the 1994 Republican Revolution, and from January 3, 1995 until January 3, 1997, he was a member of the 104th United States Congress. He was an unsuccessful candidate for re-election to the 105th United States Congress, receiving 47% of the vote against Democrat Adam Smith.

He secured passage of an amendment to the 1996 illegal immigration bill, which is now found at 8 U.S.C. 1182(a)(9). This amendment prohibits a visa or legal status to anyone who has been in the U.S. without authorization for over a year, notwithstanding the existence of U.S. Citizen children of that immigrant. After his one term in Congress, he became a leader of Pat Robertson's Christian Coalition.

External links

1965 births
Living people
Republican Party members of the Washington House of Representatives
American Christians
Western Washington University alumni
Politicians from Puyallup, Washington
Republican Party members of the United States House of Representatives from Washington (state)

Members of Congress who became lobbyists